PMRS is an acronym that may refer to:
 Palestinian Medical Relief Society, a community based Arab health organization, that offers grassroots medical services in the West Bank
 Plasma membrane redox system